The Town of Garden City is a Statutory Town located in Weld County, Colorado, United States. The town population was 227 at the 2020 United States Census. Garden City is a part of the Greeley, CO Metropolitan Statistical Area and the Front Range Urban Corridor. It is surrounded by the cities of Greeley and Evans, Colorado.

Geography
Garden City is located at  (40.394766, -104.688634).

Demographics

As of the census of 2000, there were 357 people, 130 households, and 79 families residing in the town. The racial makeup of the town was 46.50% White, 2.52% Native American, 1.68% Asian, 47.62% from other races, and 1.68% from two or more races. Hispanic or Latino of any race were 68.35% of the population.

There were 130 households, out of which 32.3% had children under the age of 18 living with them, 33.1% were married couples living together, 14.6% had a female householder with no husband present, and 38.5% were non-families. 23.8% of all households were made up of individuals, and 4.6% had someone living alone who was 65 years of age or older.  The average household size was 2.75 and the average family size was 3.18.

In the town, the population was spread out, with 27.5% under the age of 18, 21.6% from 18 to 24, 32.5% from 25 to 44, 11.8% from 45 to 64, and 6.7% who were 65 years of age or older.  The median age was 25 years. For every 100 females, there were 125.9 males.  For every 100 females aged 18 and over, there were 131.3 males.

The median income for a household in the town was $21,875, and the median income for a family was $24,722. Males had a median income of $21,563 versus $16,250 for females. The per capita income for the town was $8,646.  About 16.7% of families and 23.6% of the population were below the poverty line, including 22.2% of those under age 18 and 8.0% of those aged 65 or over.

History 
Garden City was founded on August 2, 1938, as a base for saloons and liquor stores serving residents of nearby Greeley, Colorado, which was then a Dry City. Shortly after the repeal of Prohibition in the United States, in June 1935, Greeley voters, by a majority of 356 votes, voted in the local option election to make Greeley "dry" and prohibit the sale, manufacture, transportation, or possession of liquor in the city limits of Greeley. The morning following the election, two Greeley liquor stores were closed by the Chief of Police. The Greeley Tribune published several articles about a Wet Town incorporating Greeley's southern edge.

This area was home to a 10-acre area known at the time as Ray's Cottage Camp, owned by Mrs. A.F. Ray. The law for incorporating a town at the time required a petition to be filled with Weld County of 30 or more residents who were also landowners. Mrs. Ray sold cabins and lots in her Cottage Camp for as little as $100.00 so that Garden City could meet the petition criteria.

According to Tribune articles written at the time, the incorporation of Garden City was challenged and found to be invalid twice but Garden City did finally become incorporated on the third attempt in 1938. According to the incorporation document on file in the Clerk's Office, the incorporation date was August 2, 1938.

Education
Garden City is within Weld County School District Six. As of 2008 residents are zoned to Jackson Elementary School, Brentwood Middle School, and Greeley Central High School. All of the schools assigned to Garden City are in Greeley.

See also

Colorado
Bibliography of Colorado
Index of Colorado-related articles
Outline of Colorado
List of counties in Colorado
List of municipalities in Colorado
List of places in Colorado
List of statistical areas in Colorado
Front Range Urban Corridor
North Central Colorado Urban Area
Denver-Aurora, CO Combined Statistical Area
Greeley, CO Metropolitan Statistical Area

References

External links

Town of Garden City website
CDOT map of the Town of Garden City

Towns in Colorado
Towns in Weld County, Colorado